The following is a list of political parties in New Brunswick, Canada.

Parties represented in the Legislative Assembly

Other registered parties

Historical parties represented in the Legislative Assembly
 Confederation of Regions 1989–2002
 New Brunswick Labour Party 1921–1925
 United Farmers Party 1921–1925
 People's Alliance. 2010-2022

Other historical parties
 Parti Acadien
 Confederation Party 
 Anti-Confederation Party
 Grey Party of New Brunswick 2002–2003
 Social Credit Party of New Brunswick

See also
Elections New Brunswick

 
Parties
New Brunswick

fr:Partis politiques canadiens#Nouveau-Brunswick